A smoking monkey is a novelty item in the form of a 2-inch plastic monkey. When a speciality cigarette is inserted into the monkey's mouth and lit the figure gives the impression it's smoking. The cigarettes do not contain any tobacco.

In popular culture
In The Simpsons fourth season episode Marge in Chains unscrupulous attorney Lionel Hutz offers Homer Simpson and his wife Marge a smoking monkey if they hire him. It's also revealed he keeps a drawer full of them in his desk.

References

Novelty items